Gesha is a village in Dryanovo Municipality, in Gabrovo Province, in northern central Bulgaria.

Honours
Gesha Point on Clarence Island, Antarctica is named after the village.

References

Villages in Gabrovo Province